The name Çardak might refer to:

 Çardak, a town and a district in Denizli Province, Turkey
 Çardak, Çanakkale
 Çardak, Silvan
 Çardak, Yenişehir
 Çardak, Yeşilova
 Çardak Airport, Denizli's airport situated in the town of Çardak, Turkey

See also 
 Čardak (disambiguation)